Knipowitschia montenegrina is a species of freshwater goby Endemic to the Morača River in Montenegro where it prefers shallows and small pools with algae covered gravel substrates.  This species can reach a length of  SL.

References 

montenigrina
Freshwater fish of Europe
Endemic fauna of Montenegro
Fish described in 2007